Diego Hurtado de Mendoza y Luna, 3rd Duke of the Infantado, nicknamed El Grande, (Arenas de San Pedro, Spain, 11 March 1461 – Guadalajara, Castile-La Mancha, Spain, 30 August 1531) was a Spanish noble.

He was born in one of the richest and most influential families of Castile.
He was the son of  Íñigo López de Mendoza y Luna, 2nd Duke of the Infantado (* Guadalajara, Castile-La Mancha, 1438 - Guadalajara, Castile-La Mancha, 1500) and the grandson of Diego Hurtado de Mendoza, 1st Duke of the Infantado, (* Guadalajara, Castile-La Mancha, 1415  - Manzanares el Real,  1479). He became 3rd duke in 1500.

He married, first, circa 1491, Maria Pimentel y Pacheco (deceased 1499), daughter of Rodrigo Afonso Pimentel, 4th count and 1st duke of Benavente. 
They had 4 children :

 Íñigo López de Mendoza, 4th Duke of the Infantado, (1493–1566).
 Rodrigo de Mendoza, 1st marquis of Montes-Claros.
 Ana, married Luis de la Cerda,  1st marquis of Cogolludo.
 Marina, married Diego Arias.

He remarried in 1530 with Maria Maldonado, no issue.

He participated in the conquest of Granada, distinguishing himself in the conquest of Loja.
He was a strong political opponent of Cardinal Cisneros and defended the rights of the nobles.

In 1519, he became a Knight of the Order of the Golden Fleece on proposal of King Charles I of Spain, a.k.a. Charles V, Holy Roman Emperor. 
During the Revolt of the Comuneros in 1520 and 1521, the duke of Infantado played a cautious waiting game to see which side would win.
In 1521 he chose to support King Charles I, mostly because of his hate towards Bishop Acuña.

King Francis I of France stayed in his palace, after the King had been taken prisoner in the Battle of Pavia in 1525.
In his old age, the Duke suffered from gout and led a pious life. 
The Catalan composer Mateo Flecha was in his service from 1525 until his death.

References
http://www.geneall.net/H/per_page.php?id=64632
Los Mendoza:El tercer duque del Infantado (In Spanish)

1461 births
1531 deaths
Knights of the Golden Fleece
3